Norsk Tindeklub is a Norwegian mountaineering association.  The club was founded in 1908. The association issues climbing guides and mountaineering books. The club has issued several jubilee books in the series Norsk Fjellsport (1914, 1933, 1948, 1958, 1968, 1983, 1998, 2008). The club has three cabins, in Skagadalen (Hurrungane), Vengedalen (Romsdalen) and Flatvaddalen (Innerdalen).

References

Sports organisations of Norway
Sports organizations established in 1908
Climbing organizations
1908 establishments in Norway